Francis Buchholz (born 19 February 1954) is a German musician best known as the bass guitarist of German rock band Scorpions from 1973 until 1992. Since leaving Scorpions he has been a member of Michael Schenker's Temple Of Rock.

Biography
Born in Hanover, West Germany, Buchholz discovered rock music at the age of 11. His first public appearance as a bass player was at age 15 while in a high school. From then on he played in different rock, blues and jazz bands in his hometown of Hannover. While a mechanical engineering student at the University of Hannover and taking classes at the Hochschule für Musik, Theater und Medien Hannover, Buchholz joined Dawn Road, whose lineup included guitarist Uli Roth. Eventually the musicians from Dawn Road and the Scorpions merged into a new incarnation of the Scorpions in 1973, with Buchholz on bass. Buchholz' first recording with the Scorpions was 1974's Fly to the Rainbow, and he stayed as a band member for 18 years, recording 12 albums during the band's most commercially successful period. Together they sold over 15 million records in the USA alone and over 100 million records worldwide. For his success with the Scorpions, Buchholz was awarded with over 50 gold and platinum awards for record sales all over the world. He left the band after a disagreement over band management in 1992. His last album with the Scorpions was Crazy World, which also contained the only Scorpions track Buchholz contributed to writing, "Kicks After Six".

Buchholz reunited with Uli Roth for a tour of Europe and the United States in 2005 and 2006. 
In 2008 Buchholz worked with the band Dreamtide as their bassplayer and co-producer, the album "Dream And Deliver" was released in Japan (King Records), Europe (AOR Heaven) and worldwide on iTunes.

In 2012, Buchholz toured with former Scorpions lead guitarist Michael Schenker for the European dates of his "Temple of Rock - Lovedrive Reunion Tour" alongside former Scorpions drummer Herman Rarebell, with ex-Rainbow vocalist Doogie White and MSG's Wayne Findley on guitars and keys. The "Temple of Rock – Lovedrive Reunion" tour went through Europe and Far East. A DVD, Blu-ray and Double-CD "Temple Of Rock - Live in Europe" was released for Christmas 2012.

Temple Of Rock's next album "Bridge The Gap" featured Buchholz on Bass, it was released in November 2013. A European tour in 2013 was followed by concerts in Mexico and South America and in 2014 they toured Japan and Europe. Their new album "Spirit On A Mission was released in 2015 and the band toured USA, Japan and Europe. Early in 2016 they play more shows in UK and Scandinavia.

Records

With the Scorpions 

 1974: Fly to the Rainbow
 1975: In Trance
 1976: Virgin Killer
 1977: Taken by Force
 1978: Tokyo Tapes (live)
 1979: Lovedrive
 1980: Animal Magnetism
 1982: Blackout
 1984: Love at First Sting
 1985: World Wide Live (live)
 1988: Savage Amusement
 1990: Crazy World

With Dreamtide 

 2008: Dream and Deliver

With Michael Schenker's Temple Of Rock 

 2012: Live in Europe (DVD, Bonus-DVD, Blu-Ray und Doppel-CD)
 2013: Bridge the Gap
 2015: Spirit on a Mission
 2016: On a Mission - Live in Madrid (DVD, Doppel-Blu-Ray und Doppel-CD)

With Phantom 5 

 2016: Phantom 5 (CD)

Personal life
In 1978, Buchholz founded a PA and stage lighting rental company, Rocksound, in Germany. The company began as a way to distribute special exponential loudspeaker cabinets Buchholz had developed, but also to provide employment for the Scorpions' roadies when not on tour. The company thrived in the 1980s and 1990s.

Buchholz lives in Hannover, Germany, with his wife Hella, they have a son and twin daughters.

In 1996, Buchholz authored the book Bass Magic, he also worked as a record producer and consultant.

References

External links
 Francis Buchholz, The Official Site

1954 births
Living people
German heavy metal bass guitarists
Male bass guitarists
German rock bass guitarists
Musicians from Hanover
German record producers
Scorpions (band) members
Businesspeople from Hanover
Hochschule für Musik, Theater und Medien Hannover alumni
Michael Schenker Group members
German male guitarists
Glam metal musicians